TED Ankara College Foundation Schools is a group of private schools in Turkey. College consists of kindergarten, elementary, middle and high schools. TED Ankara College Foundation Schools Incek Campus is located in  Ankara, Turkey.

History 
At the request of Mustafa Kemal Atatürk, the Turkish Education Association (Turkish:Türk Eğitim Derneği, abbreviated TED) was founded in 1928 and led the establishment of qualified Turkish schools.

TED Ankara College was founded in 1930 as the first school established by TED, and was the first private Turkish school established after the foundation of Republic of Turkey to instruct in English. In 1931, the primary school, in 1933, the middle school, in 1936 the high school were established. In 1963, the school's administration was handed over to TED Ankara College Foundation. In 2000, the foundation started to build a campus in İncek, Ankara. In 2003-2004 they moved their establishments from Kolej, Ankara to this campus. The name Kolej, the district where TED Ankara College Foundation Schools were located, is coming from the name of the college. The emblem of the schools is coming from the emblem of the association.

TED Ankara College currently has more than 5,000 students, 500 teachers, 220 employees and 26,000 alumni.

TED Ankara College Foundation High School is accredited to give IB Diploma Program by International Baccalaureate Organization - (IBO) and is one of the IB Schools in Turkey.

Campus life 

TED Ankara College Foundation İncek campus has 141,000 square meters of enclosed area and over 309,000 square meters of open area.

The campus is located east of Taşpınar village on Yumrubel in İncek, which is in the south part of the capital city, Ankara.

College library 
TED Ankara College Library is situated in the TED Ankara College Campus. The library is divided into four buildings in the campus. The primary school library is in the north building complex, the secondary school and high school libraries are in the east building complexes and there is another section in the administration building which is situated in the middle. The high school library also contains an additional research library inside.

Each library has a specific level of content according to where it is located (i.e. primary school, secondary school, or high school library). All four libraries use Dewey Classification system and all the books except the ones in the research library are available to borrow.

Library also hosts a website which the books can be found online, there are also some additional online content in the library's website.

Notable alumni
in alphabetical order of family names
 Muazzez Abacı - Singer
 Filiz Akın - Actress
 Derya Akkaynak - Oceanographer
 Mustafa Altıoklar - Famous Turkish film director, producer and screenwriter.
 Oğuz Atay - Famous Turkish author, pioneer of novel writing in Turkey
 Ali Babacan (1985) - Politician, former Minister of Economics, Minister of Foreign Affairs
 Mithat Bereket (1966) - Journalist
 Hüsamettin Cindoruk - Politician, former Speaker of the Parliament of Turkey
 Emin Çölaşan - Journalist
 Ali Doğramacı - President, Bilkent University
 Can Dündar - Author, Journalist
 Erol Gelenbe (1962) - Computer Scientist, Professor at Imperial College, London, Member of the French National Academy of Engineering, Member of the Turkish Academy of Sciences, and Member of Academia Europaea
 Faruk Gül - Chair of the Department of Economics, Princeton University
 Erman Ilıcak - Chairman of Rönesans Construction
 Nur Koçak - Artist
 Zülfü Livaneli - Musician
 Reha Muhtar - Anchorman
 Aras Onur - Author, poet
 Beren Saat - Actress
 Güler Sabancı (1955)- Chairwoman of Sabancı Holding
 Oktay Sinanoğlu - Professor of Physics
 Kartal Tibet - Actor
 Alper Uçar (2003) - Turkey's first Olympian (along with partner Alisa Agafonova) in ice dance
 Murat Vargı - Founder, Turkcell
 Timucin Esen - Actor
 Tamer Karadağlı - Actor

See also 
 List of high schools in Turkey
 TED Ankara Kolejliler, the associated sports club
 ÖSS

References

External links 
TED Ankara College Website

High schools in Ankara
International Baccalaureate schools in Turkey
Ankara